Karel Anthonie Godin de Beaufort  (16 January 1850, Utrecht – 7 April 1921, Maarsbergen) was a Dutch politician.

References
Jhr.Mr. K.A. Godin de Beaufort at Parlement & Politiek

'

1850 births
1921 deaths
Ministers of Finance of the Netherlands
Members of the House of Representatives (Netherlands)
Members of the Senate (Netherlands)
Municipal councillors of Utrecht (city)
Anti-Revolutionary Party politicians
Christian Historical Union politicians
20th-century Dutch politicians
Dutch nobility
Utrecht University alumni